VA-128 was an Attack Squadron of the U.S. Navy, nicknamed the Golden Intruders. It was established on 1 September 1967, and disestablished in September 1995.

Operational history
September 1967: The squadron was assigned the mission of training combat ready flight crews and replacement maintenance personnel for the A-6 Intruder.
October 1968: Two U.S. Air Force exchange officers reported aboard for training in the A-6A.
June 1973: A Naval Officer from the Federal Republic of Germany reported aboard for training in the A-6.
March–May 1980: The squadron’s TC-4C, Target Recognition Attack Multisensor (TRAM) equipped aircraft, was used to monitor the hot spots on Mount St. Helens in Washington state prior to a major eruption on 18 May. The squadron’s work with U.S. Geological Survey authorities provided the forewarning necessary to save hundreds of lives since the mountain was a popular place for campers, boaters and mountain climbers.
October 1986: The squadron assumed the additional duty of training all U.S. Marine Corps personnel on the A-6 following the disestablishment of VMAT(AW)-202.
1990: The squadron received the first composite wing A-6E on the West Coast.

Home port assignments
The squadron was assigned to these home ports, effective on the dates shown:
NAS Whidbey Island – 01 Sep 1967

Aircraft assignment
The squadron first received the following aircraft on the dates shown:
 A-6A Intruder – 01 Sep 1967
 TC-4C Academe – 15 Mar 1968
 A-6E Intruder – 16 Dec 1973

See also
 List of squadrons in the Dictionary of American Naval Aviation Squadrons
 Attack aircraft
 List of inactive United States Navy aircraft squadrons
 History of the United States Navy

References

External links

 The Intruder Association VA-128 website

Attack squadrons of the United States Navy
Wikipedia articles incorporating text from the Dictionary of American Naval Aviation Squadrons